United States intervention in Chilean politics started during the War of Chilean Independence (1812–1826). The influence of United States in both the economic and the political arenas of Chile has since gradually increased over the last two centuries, and continues to be significant.

Chilean independence
The arrival of Joel Roberts Poinsett, in 1811, marked the beginning of U.S. involvement in Chilean politics. He had been sent by President James Madison in 1809 as a special agent to the South American Spanish colonies (a position he filled from 1810 to 1814) to investigate the prospects of the revolutionaries, in their struggle for independence from Spain.

War scare of 1891
During the 1891 Chilean Civil War, the U.S. backed President José Manuel Balmaceda, as a way to increase their influence in Chile, while Britain backed the successful Congressional forces.

Itata incident

The Itata incident concerned an attempted shipment in 1891 by the ship Itata of arms purchased in California. The sale was illegal in US law and was designed to assist the insurgent Congressional forces. The US Navy intercepted the ship and seized the arms.

Baltimore crisis

Washington sent a warship to Chile to protect American interests. The crew of the Baltimore took shore leave at Valparaiso. During the US sailors' shore leave on 16 October 1891, a mob of enraged Chileans angry about the Itata's capture, attacked them.  Two American sailors were killed, 17 were wounded and 36 others were jailed. That Valparaiso riot prompted saber rattling from enraged US officials. A war between the U.S. and Chile was remotely possible. Chile's foreign minister escalated the tension but in Washington Secretary of State James G. Blaine cooled off the hotheads. The crisis ended when the Chilean government bowed, and while maintaining that the seamen were to blame for the riot paid an indemnity of $75,000 to the victims' families.

First half of the 20th century

United States involvement in Chilean affairs intensified in the early decades of the 20th century. After World War I, the United States replaced Britain as the leading superpower controlling most of Chile's resources, as most economic activity in the country lay in US hands. Such a change prevented Chile from profiting as a result of the war and gaining its financial independence. The dependence on the United States formally began in the early years of the 1920s as two major US companies Anaconda and Kennecott took control of the valuable resources. Up until the 1970s, "both industries controlled between 7% to 20% of the country's Gross Domestic Product".

The conclusion of World War II brought more of the same as Chile could not even exploit the "excess of copper they produced as almost all the copper was marketed through subsidiaries of United States copper firms established in Chile for whom the allied government fixed a ceiling price upon copper products during the course of the war."

As the working class demanded an improvement in their standard of living, higher wages and improved working conditions, the notion that a leftist government could be the solution for the people began to take form.

1950s and 1960s

During the 1950s and 1960s, the United States put forward a variety of programs and strategies, ranging from funding political campaigns to funding propaganda, aimed at impeding the presidential aspirations of leftist candidate Salvador Allende, who served as President of the Senate (1966-1969) before running a final time to become the 28th President of Chile, which lasted until his death in 1973. Throughout these two decades, left-wing parties in Chile failed to gain power, in part due to the fact that the United States was, verifiably, impeding the left wing parties through various means. In the 1958 presidential election, Jorge Alessandri – a nominal independent with support from the Liberal and Conservative parties – defeated Allende by nearly 33,500 votes to claim the presidency. His laissez-faire policies, endorsed by the United States, were regarded as the solution to the country's inflation problems. Under recommendations from the United States, Alessandri steadily reduced tariffs starting in 1959, a policy that caused the Chilean market to be overwhelmed by American product. These governmental policies angered the working class of Chile, who demanded higher wages, and the repercussions of this massive discontent were felt in the 1961 congressional elections. The president suffered terrible blows, sending the message that laissez-faire policies were not desired. As the "grand total of $130 million from the U.S. banking Industry, the U.S. Treasury Department, the IMF and the ICA" accepted by Alessandri illustrates, laissez-faire policies may have induced the opposite of the intended effect – making Chile more dependent on the United States, not less.

Presidential candidate Salvador Allende was a top contender in the 1964 election. The US, through the Central Intelligence Agency (CIA), covertly spent three million dollars campaigning against him, before and after the election, mostly through radio and print advertising. The Americans viewed electing Christian Democratic contender Eduardo Frei Montalva as vital, fearing that Alessandri's failures would lead the people to support Allende. Allende was feared by the Americans because of his warm relations with Cuba and his open criticism of the Bay of Pigs Invasion. Furthermore, clandestine aid to Frei was put forward through John F. Kennedy's Latin American Alliance for Progress, which promised "$20 billion in public and private assistance in the country for the next decade."

The 1970 election
According to a U.S. Senate select committee, publishing a Church Commission Report in 1975 to describe international abuses committed by the CIA, NSA, and FBI, covert United States involvement in Chile in the decade between 1963 and 1973 was "extensive and continuous". The CIA spent $8 million in the three years between 1970 and the military coup of September 1973, with over $3 million allocated toward Chilean intervention in 1972 alone. Covert American activity was present in almost every major election in Chile in the decade between 1963 and 1973, but its tangible effect on electoral outcomes is not altogether clear. Chile, more than any of its South American neighbors, had a long-standing democratic tradition dating back to the early 1930s, and it has been difficult to gauge how successful CIA tactics were in swaying voters.

A declassified file from August 19, 1970, reveals the minutes of high-level officials in the CIA known as the "Special Review Group." It was chaired by Henry Kissinger and was sanctioned by then-president Nixon. This was one of several documents released as part of the Foreign Relations of the United States (FRUS) series dedicated toward US-Chilean interventionalism – collectively known as Foreign Relations of the United States, 1969–1976, Volume XXI, Chile, 1969–1973 and Foreign Relations, 1969–1976, Volume E–16, Documents on Chile, 1969–1973 – that revealed a detailed account of correspondences between each of these officials, telegrams from the Chilean embassy, memorandums, and "Special Reports" concerning the state of affairs in Chile. For instance, a National Intelligence Estimate from January 28, 1969, stated the problems and conclusions that senior officials in Washington identified over the proliferating crisis in Chile. The document indicates that the 1970 election stood above all other issues as of critical importance, with Chile's political and economic stability depending heavily on that particular election's outcome; the document notes the possibility of out of control economic stagnation and inflation in Chile as concerns. The conclusions of the document suggest that factionalism needed to be addressed, and expounded on United States interests in copper extraction companies operating in Chile. The election represented the potential for important economic relations to collapse or continue. The document further focuses on potential ramifications if the election outcome were to not align with US interests.

At a 8 September 1970 meeting of the 40 Committee, the chairman of the committee asked for an analysis of where the US/CIA stood in terms of taking action to prevent Allende from becoming President of Chile. William Broe, a high-ranking CIA officer, said Eduardo Frei Montalva, the 29th President of Chile, was essential to the situation in Chile, regardless of the type of involvement — military or congressional. The 40 Committee asked that the CIA collect information and create more intelligence reports to see what could be further done in Chile. The committee decided it was unlikely they were going to be able to influence the 24 Oct, congressional election to go against Allende. Helms was also concerned about Allende supporters in the Chilean military, as it seemed they would support Allende in the event of a coup. As a result of all this information, the Committee decided they wanted a full analysis of two things: (1.) a cost versus benefit analysis of organizing a military (Chilean) coup; (2.) a cost versus benefit analysis of organizing future oppositions to Allende to topple his influence. This presented two options for Henry Kissinger: political maneuvering or outright force.

Four days after the 8 September 1970 meeting of the 40 Committee, a cable between Richard Helms and Henry Kissinger discussed the lack of morale that the US embassy had in Chile according to the American Ambassador to Chile, Edward Korry. Kissinger stated in response that he would call another 40 Committee Meeting for the following Monday. Kissinger further noted: "We will not let Chile go down the drain."

Allende presidency
Salvador Allende ran again in the 1970 presidential election, winning a narrow victory plurality vote (near 37%). United States president Richard Nixon feared that Chile could become "another Cuba" and the US cut off most of its foreign aid to Chile. The US government believed that Allende would become closer to socialist countries, such as Cuba and the Soviet Union. They feared that Allende would push Chile into socialism, and therefore lose all of the US investments made in Chile.

On 15 September 1970; before Allende took office, Richard Nixon gave the order to overthrow Allende. According to a declassified document from the NSA, the handwritten notes from Richard Helms (CIA director at the time) state: "1 in 10 chance perhaps, but save Chile!; worth spending; not concerned; no involvement of embassy; $10,000,000 available, more if necessary; full-time job--best men we have; game plan; make the economy scream; 48 hours for plan of action." These notes came from a meeting Helms had with President Nixon, indicating the administration's willingness to stage a coup in Chile and the extent to which Nixon was willing to go to do so. On 5 November 1970, Henry Kissinger advised President Nixon against peaceful coexistence with the Allende administration and instead advocated one of two positions. The U.S. government had two approaches to fighting Marxism as represented by Allende. "Track I" was a State Department initiative designed to thwart Allende by subverting Chilean elected officials within the bounds of the Chilean constitution and excluded the CIA. Track I expanded to encompass some policies whose ultimate goal was to create the conditions that would encourage a coup. "Track II" was a CIA operation overseen by Henry Kissinger and CIA's director of covert operations, Thomas Karamessines. "Track II" excluded the State Department and Department of Defense. The goal of Track II was to find and support Chilean military officers that would support a coup.

Immediately after the Allende government came into office, the U.S. sought to place pressure on the Allende government to prevent its consolidation and limit its ability to implement policies contrary to U.S. and hemispheric interests, such as Allende's total nationalization of several U.S. corporations and the copper industry. Nixon directed that no new bilateral economic aid commitments be undertaken with the government of Chile. The US supported Allende's opponents in Chile during his presidency, intending to encourage either Allende's resignation, his overthrow, or his defeat in the election of 1976. The Nixon administration covertly funded independent and non-state media and labor unions.

Track I
Track I was a U.S. State Department plan designed to persuade the Chilean Congress, through outgoing Christian Democratic President Eduardo Frei Montalva, to confirm conservative runner-up Jorge Alessandri as president. Alessandri would resign shortly after, rendering Frei eligible to run against Allende in new elections. As part of the "Track I" strategy to block Allende from assuming office after the 4 September election, the CIA needed to influence a Congressional run-off vote required by the Constitution since Allende did not win the absolute majority.

Track II

The CIA had also drawn up a second plan, Track II. The agency would find military officers willing to support a coup and support them. They could then call new elections in which Allende could be defeated.

In September 1970, President Nixon found that an Allende government in Chile would not be acceptable and authorized $10 million to stop Allende from coming to power or unseat him. As part of the Track II initiative, the CIA used false flag operatives to approach Chilean military officers, to encourage them to carry out a coup. A first step to overthrowing Allende required removing General René Schneider, the army chief commander. Schneider was a constitutionalist and would oppose a coup d'état. To assist in the planned kidnapping of Schneider, the CIA provided "$50,000 in cash, three submachine guns, and a satchel of tear gas, all approved at headquarters ..." The submachine guns were delivered by diplomatic pouch.

A group was formed, led by the retired General Roberto Viaux. Viaux was considered unstable by the U.S. and had been discouraged from attempting a coup alone. The CIA encouraged him to join forces with an active duty general, Camilo Valenzuela, who had also been approached by CIA operatives. They were joined by an Admiral, Hugo Tirado, who had been forced into retirement after the Tacnazo insurrection. On 22 October, Viaux went ahead with a plan to kidnap General René Schneider. Schneider drew a handgun to protect himself from his attackers, who shot him in four vital areas. He died in Santiago's military hospital three days later. This attempted kidnapping and death of Schneider shocked the public and increased support for the Chilean Constitution. This ultimately led to an extreme contrast to the expected outcome of a coup. The Chilean people rallied around their government which, in turn, overwhelmingly ratified Allende on 3 November 1970.

On 25 November 1970, Henry Kissinger issued a memorandum that detailed the Covert Action Program that the US would spearhead in Chile. In the memorandum, Kissinger stated that there were five principles of the program. The US would continue to have contacts in the Chilean military, take steps to divide Allende's supporters, cooperate with the media to run anti-Allende propaganda campaigns, support non-communist political parties in Chile, and publish materials that stated that Allende did not adhere to the democratic process and also wanted to form connections with Cuba and the Soviet Union.

A CIA and White House cover-up obscured American involvement, despite Congressional investigative efforts. The Church Committee, which investigated U.S. involvement in Chile during this period, determined that the weapons used in the debacle "were, in all probability, not those supplied by the CIA to the conspirators."

After Schneider's death, the CIA recovered the submachine guns and money it had provided. Both Valenzuela and Viaux were arrested and convicted of conspiracy after Schneider's assassination. One member of the coup plotters that escaped arrest requested assistance from the CIA, and was paid $35,000, so "The CIA did, in fact, pay "hush" money to those directly responsible for the Schneider assassination—and then covered up that secret payment for thirty years."

In 1970, the U.S. manufacturing company ITT Corporation owned 70% of Chitelco, the Chilean Telephone Company, and funded El Mercurio, a Chilean right-wing newspaper. The CIA used ITT as a conduit to financially aid opponents of Allende's government. On 28 September 1973, ITT's headquarters in New York City, was bombed by the Weather Underground for the alleged involvement of the company in the overthrow of Allende.

On 10 September 2001, a suit was filed by the family of Schneider, accusing former U.S. Secretary of State Henry Kissinger of arranging Schneider's 1970 murder because he would have opposed a military coup. CIA documents indicate that while the CIA had sought his kidnapping, his killing was never intended. Kissinger said he had declared the coup "hopeless" and had "turned it off". However, the CIA claimed that no such "stand-down" order was ever received.

1973 coup

On September 11, 1973, Augusto Pinochet rose to power, overthrowing the democratically elected president Salvador Allende. A subsequent September 2000 report from the CIA, using declassified documents related to the military coup, found that the CIA "probably appeared to condone" the 1973 coup, but that there was "no evidence" that the US actually participated in it. This view has been challenged by some authors, who have stated that the covert support of the United States was crucial to the preparation for the coup, the coup itself, and the consolidation of the regime afterward. It seemed to the CIA that, even if this coup did not come together, Allende would still have a very difficult political future. This point of view has been supported by non-scholarly commentary.

According to the CIA document "CIA Activities in Chile", dated 18 September 2000, the local CIA station suggested during late summer 1973 that the US commit itself to support a military coup. In response, CIA Headquarters reaffirmed to the station that "there was to be no involvement with the military in any covert action initiative; there was no support for instigating a military coup."

On the issue of CIA involvement in the 1973 coup, the CIA document is equally explicit:

On 10 September 1973 -- the day before the coup that ended the Allende government -- a Chilean military officer reported to a CIA officer that a coup was being planned and asked for US government assistance. He was told that the US Government would not provide any assistance because this was strictly an internal Chilean matter. The Station Officer also told him his request would be forwarded to Washington. CIA learned of the exact date of the coup shortly before it took place. During the attack on the Presidential Palace and its immediate aftermath, the Station's activities were limited to providing intelligence and situation reports.

The report of the Church Committee, published in 1975, stated that during the period leading up to the coup, the CIA received information about potential coup plots.

The intelligence network continued to report throughout 1972 and 1973 on coup plotting activities. During 1972 the Station continued to monitor the group which might mount a successful coup, and it spent a significantly greater amount of time and effort penetrating this group than it had on previous groups. This group had originally come to the Station's attention in October 1971. By January 1972 the Station had successfully penetrated it and was in contact through an intermediary with its leader.

Intelligence reporting on coup plotting reached two peak periods, one in the last week of June 1973 and the other during the end of August and the first two weeks in September. It is clear the CIA received intelligence reports on the coup planning of the group which carried out the successful September 11 coup throughout the months of July, August, and September 1973.

The Church report also considered the allegation that the US government involved itself in the 1973 coup:

Was the United States DIRECTLY involved, covertly, in the 1973 coup in Chile? The Committee has found no evidence that it was.

There is no hard evidence of direct U.S. assistance to the coup, despite frequent allegations of such aid. Rather the United States - by its previous actions during Track II, its existing general posture of opposition to Allende, and the nature of its contacts with the Chilean military- probably gave the impression that it would not look with disfavor on a military coup. And U.S. officials in the years before 1973 may not always have succeeded in walking the thin line between monitoring indigenous coup plotting and actually stimulating it.

Transcripts of a phone conversation between Kissinger and Nixon reveal that they did not have a hand in the final coup. They do take credit for creating the conditions that led to the coup. Kissinger says that "they created the conditions as great as possible." Nixon and Kissinger also discussed how they would play this event with the media and lamented the fact that, if this were the era of Eisenhower, then they would be seen as heroes. There was a PDB that had a section on Chile dated 11 September 1973 that is still completely censored, as was an entire page on Chile provided to Nixon on 8 September 1973. Additionally, a cable from CIA operative Jack Devine dated 10 September 1973, confirmed to top U.S. officials that the coup would take place the following day. In collaboration with the coup, a Defense Intelligence Agency summary, also dated on 8 September and classified "Top Secret Umbra", provided detailed information on an agreement among the Chilean Army, Navy, and Air Force to move against Allende on 10 September. As the CIA denies its involvement in the coup, another cable sent from the agency on 8 September classified "Secret" had information on the Chilean Navy time and date to overthrow the government of President Allende. The cable also identified key Chilean officials who were supporting the coup. The cables from around this time with another one stating that the coup was postponed in order to improve tactical coordination and would attempt the coup on 11 September.

A CIA intelligence report 25 October 1973, concerning General Arellano Stark, noted that Arellano had ordered the deaths of 21 political prisoners. Also, the disappearances of 14 other prisoners were also believed to be on the order of Arellano. General Arellano was considered Pinochet's right-hand man after the coup.

Historian Peter Winn has argued that the role of the CIA was crucial to the consolidation of power that followed the coup; the CIA helped fabricate a conspiracy against the Allende government, which Pinochet was then portrayed as preventing. He states that the coup itself was possible only through a three-year covert operation mounted by the United States. He also points out that the US imposed an "invisible blockade" that was designed to disrupt the economy under Allende, and contributed to the destabilization of the regime. Peter Kornbluh, director of the National Security Archive's Chile Documentation Project, argues in his book The Pinochet File that the US was extensively involved and actively "fomented" the 1973 coup. Authors Tim Weiner, in his book, Legacy of Ashes, and Christopher Hitchens, in his book, The Trial of Henry Kissinger similarly argue the case that US covert actions actively destabilized Allende's government and set the stage for the 1973 coup. Joaquin Fermandois criticized Kornbluh's "black and white" and "North American centered conception of world affairs", stating that a variety of internal and external factors also played a role and that a careful reading of the documentary record reveals the CIA was largely "impotent".

Conservative scholar Mark Falcoff alleged that Cuba and the Soviet Union supplied several hundred thousand dollars to the socialist and Marxist factions in the government. Peter Winn noted that "the Chilean revolution always kept to its peaceful road, despite counterrevolutionary plots and violence." Moreover, this strong emphasis on nonviolence was precisely to avoid revolutionary terror which had blemished the reputations of the French, Russian and Cuban revolutions.

Allende later committed suicide, with an article in The Atlantic stating "he committed suicide under mysterious circumstances as troops surrounded his place, ushering in more than 15 years of military dictatorship under Augusto Pinochet". Former CIA agent Jack Devine, who was active in the CIA agency during the time of the coup, told The Atlantic that overthrowing Allende's government was not the CIA's decision, but rather the decision of the White House, particularly President Nixon. The coup and U.S. involvement remain an important episode, as a New York Times report in October 2017 indicates.

Pinochet regime

The U.S. provided material support to the military regime after the coup, although criticizing it in public. A document released by the U.S. Central Intelligence Agency (CIA) in 2000, titled "CIA Activities in Chile", revealed that the CIA actively supported the military junta after the overthrow of Allende and that it made many of Pinochet's officers into paid contacts of the CIA or U.S. military, even though some were known to be involved in human rights abuses.

CIA documents show that the CIA had close contact with members of the Chilean secret police, DINA, and its chief Manuel Contreras (paid asset from 1975 to 1977 according to the CIA in 2000). Some have alleged that the CIA's one-time payment to Contreras is proof that the U.S. approved of Operation Condor and military repression within Chile. The CIA's official documents state that at one time, some members of the intelligence community recommended making Contreras into a paid contact because of his closeness to Pinochet; the plan was rejected based on Contreras' poor human rights track record, but a single payment was made due to a miscommunication. In the description of the CIA's activities in Chile, it is acknowledged that one of their high-level contacts was more predisposed to committing abuse: "although the CIA had information indicating that a high-level contact was a hard-liner and therefore more likely to commit abuses, contact with him was allowed to continue in absence of concrete information about human rights abuses."

A report dated 24 May 1977 also describes the newfound human rights abuses that may have been occurring in Chile: "reports of gross violation of human rights in Chile, which had nearly ceased earlier this year, are again on the rise...the Pinochet government is reverting to the practices that jeopardized its international standing since the 1973 coup." The document also details how these human rights violations could have caused a worsening of Chile's status on the international stage. It seems that the United States was unable to plan around these violations, as is referred to with the document's mention of high-ranking officials taking parts in the abuses also.

On 6 March 2001, the New York Times reported the existence of a recently declassified State Department document revealing that the United States facilitated communications for Operation Condor. The document, a 1978 cable from Robert E. White, the U.S. ambassador to Paraguay, was discovered by Professor J. Patrice McSherry of Long Island University, who had published several articles on Operation Condor. She called the cable "another piece of increasingly weighty evidence suggesting that U.S. military and intelligence officials supported and collaborated with Condor as a secret partner or sponsor."

In the cable, Ambassador White relates a conversation with General Alejandro Fretes Davalos, chief of staff of Paraguay's armed forces, who told him that the South American intelligence chiefs involved in Condor "keep in touch with one another through a U.S. communications installation in the Panama Canal Zone which covers all of Latin America".  This installation is "employed to co-ordinate intelligence information among the southern cone countries." White, whose message was sent to Secretary of State Cyrus Vance, was concerned that the U.S. connection to Condor might be revealed during the then ongoing investigation into the deaths of the 44 year old former Chilean diplomat Orlando Letelier and his American colleague Ronni Moffitt. Her husband Michael Moffit was in the car during the bombing, but was the only survivor. "It would seem advisable," he suggests, "to review this arrangement to insure that its continuation is in U.S. interest."

The document was found among 16,000 State, CIA, White House, Defense, and Justice Department records released in November 2000 on the nearly 17-year long Pinochet dictatorship in Chile, and Washington's role in the violent coup that brought his military regime to power. The release was the fourth and final batch of records released under the Clinton Administration's special Chile Declassification Project.

During the Pinochet regime, four American citizens were killed: Charles Horman, Frank Teruggi, Boris Weisfeiler, and Ronni Karpen Moffit. Later on, in late August 1976, the United States Government stated in a State Department Secret Memorandum, that the United States Government did play an indirect role in the death of one of the four American citizens, Charles Horman. The Secret Memorandum states:

"Based on what we have, we are persuaded that: The GOC sought Horman and felt threatened enough to order his immediate execution. The GOC might have believed this American could be killed without negative fall-out from the USG. There is some circumstantial evidence to suggest: U.S. intelligence may have played an unfortunate part in Horman's death. At best, it was limited to providing or confirming information that helped motivate his murder by the GOC. At worst, U.S. intelligence was aware the GOC saw Horman in a rather serious light and U.S. officials did nothing to discourage the logical outcome of GOC paranoia."- Department of State, Secret Memorandum, "Charles Horman Case," 25 August 1976 (uncensored version)

On 30 June 2014, a Chilean court ruled that the United States played a key role in the murders of Charles Horman and Frank Teruggi. According to Judge Jorge Zepeda, U.S. Navy Capt. Ray E. Davis, who commanded the U.S. Military Mission in Chile, gave information to the Chilean government about Horman and Teruggi that resulted in their arrest and execution in the days following the coup. The Chilean Supreme Court sought to have Davis extradited from Florida to stand trial, but he was secretly living in Santiago and died in a nursing home in 2013.

In a document declassified under the Obama administration's Chilean declassification project, documents were released stating that the CIA suspected Pinochet himself of personally giving the order for the assassination of Ronni Moffitt and Orlando Letelier. Although they were unable to gather enough intelligence that proved that he gave the order, they received shocking evidence from the Chilean Major, Armando Fernandez, who they convinced to come to the capital to provide them information, that Pinochet was directly involved in covering up the incident. Another declassified copy of a CIA special intelligence assessment on Pinochet's role in the Letelier and Moffitt assassinations were presented to the Chilean President Bachelet in 2016. That document asserts the CIA believed that Pinochet, "personally ordered his intelligence chief to carry out the murder.” Even with the evidence that they had, the Secretary of State George Shultz did not feel that there was enough to indict Pinochet but instead used the information to try to convince Reagan to change their policy with Chile. Pinochet stepped down from power in 1990 and died on 10 December 2006, without facing trial.

Politics in the 21st century
U.S. President Bill Clinton ordered the release of numerous documents relating to U.S. policy and actions toward Chile. The documents produced by various U.S. agencies were opened to the public by the U.S. State Department in October 1999. The collection of 1,100 documents dealt with the years leading up to the military coup.

Regarding Pinochet's rise to power, the CIA concluded in a report issued in 2000 that: "The CIA actively supported the military junta after the overthrow of Allende but did not assist Pinochet to assume the Presidency." However, the 2000 report also stated that: "The major CIA effort against Allende came earlier in 1970 in the failed attempt to block his election and accession to the Presidency. Nonetheless, the U.S. Administration's long-standing hostility to Allende and its past encouragement of a military coup against him were well known among Chilean coup plotters who eventually took activities of their own to oust him."

A White House press release in November 2000 acknowledged that "actions approved by the U.S. government during this period aggravated political polarization and affected Chile's long tradition of democratic elections"

In a 2003 town hall with students, high school student James Doubek asked Secretary of State Colin Powell about the United States support for the coup, to which Powell replied that "it is not a part of American history that we're proud of".

During U.S. President Barack Obama's visit to Chile in 2011, the center-left coalition of Chilean political parties asked Obama to apologize for past U.S. support of Pinochet. An interview with the Associated Press, Mr Piñera said his government was "categorically committed to contribute to the search for truth so that justice is done in all of these human rights cases". Obama did not respond to requests for an apology but said during a press conference that U.S. relations with Latin America had at times been "extremely rocky," and that people needed to learn from and understand history, but not be trapped by it.

In February 2018, in an effort to create a "lasting counterpoint", a statue honoring the slain Chilean diplomat and think tank policy analyst Orlando Letelier was erected on Massachusetts Avenue in Washington, D.C., near the location where Letelier was killed in a 1976 car bombing on the orders of Pinochet. The attack also claimed the life of Ronnie Karpen Moffitt, Letelier's 25-year-old American co-worker. Michael Moffitt, husband of Ronnie Moffitt and also in the vehicle, survived the attack. The Chilean-orchestrated assassination had brought state-sponsored terrorism by an American-backed ally to the cradle of American dominion. Three of Letelier's sons and a granddaughter whom Letelier had never been afforded the opportunity to meet attended the unveiling. The unveiling of Letelier's commemorative statue came less than two years after the Obama administration had released a "long classified CIA analysis...[that] cited 'convincing evidence that President Pinochet personally ordered his intelligence chief to carry out the murder.'" Letelier had served as Chile's ambassador to the United States under Chile's democratically elected Allende government. After Pinochet's 1973 coup, Letelier became a political prisoner and sought political asylum in the United States, where he eventually came to spearhead the economic policy mission of a D.C.-based think tank, the Institute for Policy Studies, as well as organize international condemnation of Pinochet's regime. The Institute for Policy Studies has long incorporated the advancement of human rights into the core of its mission.

See also

 Project FUBELT
 History of Chile
 Chile under Allende
 David H. Popper, US ambassador to Chile (1974–77)
 Family Jewels (Central Intelligence Agency)
 Foreign electoral intervention
 Military dictatorship of Chile (1973–90) - aftermath of the coup
 Latin America–United States relations
 Foreign interventions by the United States
 United States involvement in regime change

References

Further reading
 John Dinges (2005). The Condor Years: How Pinochet And His Allies Brought Terrorism To Three Continents. New York: The New Press. .
 Kristian Gustafson, (2007) Hostile Intent: U.S. Covert Operations in Chile, 1964–1974 (Dulles: Potomac Books)
 Tanya Harmer, (2011) Allende's Chile and the Inter-American Cold War (2011)  online
 Jonathan Haslam (2005) Nixon Administration and the Death of Allende's Chile: A Case of Assisted Suicide (2005).
 Thomas Karamessines (1970). Operating guidance cable on coup plotting in Chile, Washington: National Security Council.
 Jeane Kirkpatrick (1979). "Dictatorships and Double Standards," Commentary, November, pp34–45.
 Henry Kissinger (1970). National Security Decision 93: Policy Towards Chile, Washington: National Security Council.
 Peter Kornbluh. The Pinochet File: A Declassified Dossier on Atrocity and Accountability. New York: The New Press. .
 James F. Petras & Morris H. Morley (1974). How Allende fell: A study in U.S.–Chilean relations, Nottingham: Spokesman Books.
 Lubna Z. Qureshi (2009). Nixon, Kissinger, and Allende: U.S. Involvement in the 1973 Coup in Chile. Lexington Books. 
  Zakia Shiraz, "CIA Intervention in Chile and the Fall of the Allende Government in 1973." Journal of American Studies (2011) 45#3 pp 603–613. online at JSTOR; also online free summarizes the scholarly historiography.

External links 

 Church Report. Covert Action in Chile 1963-1973  (FOIA)
 National Security Archive's Chile Documentation Project  which provides documents obtained from FOIA requests regarding U.S. involvement in Chile, beginning with attempts to promote a coup in 1970 and continuing through U.S. support for Pinochet
 KISSINGER AND CHILE: THE DECLASSIFIED RECORD
 "Make the Economy Scream" famous instruction of Nixon to the CIA about Chile
 CIA activities in Chile (detailed report by the CIA itself)
 Chile and the United States: Declassified Documents relating to the Military Coup, 1970-1976

Central Intelligence Agency operations
History of the foreign relations of Chile
History of the foreign relations of the United States
Presidency of Salvador Allende
Chile
Chile–United States military relations
Foreign electoral intervention